Daniel Alejandro Flores Peréz (born 17 October 1981 in Cumaná, Sucre) is a Venezuelan windsurfer, who specialized in Neil Pryde RS:X class. He represented Venezuela at the 2012 Summer Olympics and has also been training for Cumaná Windsurf Club under his personal coach and mentor Juan Manuel Moreno. As of September 2013, Flores is ranked no. 31 in the world for the sailboard class by the International Sailing Federation.

Flores made his official debut at the 2011 Pan American Games in Guadalajara, Mexico, where he finished sixth in the men's sailboard class with a net score of 52, narrowly missing out a spot for the medal race by a single point.

At the 2012 Summer Olympics in London, Flores competed in the RS:X class having received a birth by his result from the World Championships in Cadiz, Spain. Struggling to attain a top position in the opening series, Flores climbed an astonishing sixteenth position on the final leg, but came up short with an accumulated net score of 252 points and a thirty-first-place finish in a fleet of thirty-eight windsurfers.

References

External links
 
 
 
 

1981 births
Living people
Olympic sailors of Venezuela
Venezuelan male sailors (sport)
Sailors at the 2012 Summer Olympics – RS:X
Sailors at the 2016 Summer Olympics – RS:X
Sailors at the 2011 Pan American Games
People from Cumaná
Sailors at the 2015 Pan American Games
South American Games bronze medalists for Venezuela
South American Games medalists in sailing
Competitors at the 2010 South American Games
Pan American Games competitors for Venezuela
21st-century Venezuelan people
Venezuelan windsurfers